Charlotte E. Burton (May 30, 1881 – March 28, 1942) was an American silent film actress.

Career

Born in San Francisco, Burton was signed by the American Film Manufacturing Company in 1912 where she worked for several years. She joined Essanay Studios which she sued in 1919 for $25,000 for breach of contract. She originally signed with the company believing she would be acting in mostly drama film but she was cast in mostly comedy films. Her salary had been $200 a week with an option for her services at the rate of $300 a week for a second year.

Charlotte claimed that she was signed by Essanay business manager, Vernon R. Day, to a contract extending from November 1916 until November 1918. She was discharged without reason. When Burton came to the Chicago, studio she refused a role offered her in a Black Cat comedy, presented to her by Essanay president George K. Spoor. She declined because she was not a comedian. Instead, she accepted a role as leading lady in a film featuring Henry B. Wallace. She admitted that she was paid for ten weeks, at $200 per week, prior to being dumped by Essanay. Essanay executives claimed Burton automatically voided her contract when she refused the comedic part.

Upon arriving in California, Burton stayed for a time at the Angleus. She came there from New York and was on her way to Santa Barbara, California to work for the American Film Company, which had its studios there. In May 1916, Burton was involved in making The Man Who Would Not Die, directed by William F. Russell and Jack Prescott.

The company of American and Canadian players spent a week in Long Beach, California, filming water scenes. Others in the cast were Harry Keenan and Leona Hutton. The script was written by Mabel Condon. Among her many co-stars in motion pictures were Mary Miles Minter, William Russell, Harold Lockwood, and Lottie Pickford.

Personal life
Burton's first marriage was to Weston Birch Wooldridge in 1904. They had a daughter together, Charlotte Burton Wooldridge (1906–1986).

In May 1917, Burton married actor William Russell in Santa Ana, California. They divorced in 1921. She remarried to contractor Darrell Stuart around 1928.

Charlotte Burton Stuart died at Good Samaritan Hospital in Los Angeles, California in 1942 from a heart attack. She was 60 years old.

Selected filmography

References

Janesville, Wisconsin Daily Gazette, "News and Notes from Movieland", August 16, 1916, Page 6.
Los Angeles Times, "Personals", January 1, 1913, Page III4.
Los Angeles Times, "Studio", May 28, 1916, Page III19.
Los Angeles Times, "Seeks Money Balm", October 22, 1919, Page I15.
Oakland Tribune, "Romances In Film World Revealed", Sunday Morning, June 24, 1917, Page 19.
Los Angeles Times, "Mrs. Charlotte B. Stuart", March 31, 1942, Page 14.

External links

 
 </ref>

1881 births
1942 deaths
American film actresses
American silent film actresses
Actresses from San Francisco
20th-century American actresses